Harry Kristensen (26 April 1915 – 20 April 1982) was a Danish racewalker. He competed in the men's 50 kilometres walk at the 1952 Summer Olympics.

References

1915 births
1982 deaths
Athletes (track and field) at the 1952 Summer Olympics
Danish male racewalkers
Olympic athletes of Denmark
Place of birth missing